The Walton Arts Center is a performing arts center. This facility located in Fayetteville, Arkansas, is currently Arkansas’ largest and busiest arts presenter, famous for bringing great performing artists and entertainers from around the world.  

The Center which was opened in 1992 is estimated to have cost about $13 million, a funding which was realised through a collaborative effort of the Walton Family Foundation, the University, the City and private sector.

The Facility had been described as an incubator for developing performing arts companies and it currently houses three resident companies: Symphony of Northwest Arkansas—the region’s professional symphony orchestra; Trike Theatre for Youth—professional theater company for young audiences; and Community Creative Center—an art studio for adults and youth.

In 2016, the facility was renovated with $23 million and expanded with additional 30,000 square foot.

History 

The idea for the Walton Arts Center started in the 1980s with a donation from Sam Walton to the University of Arkansas for the creation of a performance space.  After talking with the city of Fayetteville who were also looking for a multi-purpose space for conferences and special events, the corner of Dickson Street and North School Avenue was chosen for being approximately halfway between downtown Fayetteville and the University.  Finally in 1986 the Walton Arts Center Council was formed with the task of the construction of the facility.

In 2009 Peter B. Lane was appointed the Center's third President/CEO.
In 2013 the Arkansas Music Pavilion  was relocated to the City of Rogers, AR
In 2014 construction of Walmart Arkansas Music Pavilion was completed. and the City of Fayetteville held a ground-breaking ceremony of demolition of JOC for a new parking deck.
In 2016 a $23 Million renovation and expansion of the Walton Arts Center was completed.

Resident Companies and Partner Organizations 

The Walton Arts Center, in addition to presenting seasons of performance and visual arts exhibitions, also hosts several resident organizations who also produce and present arts and education programs.

TheatreSquared was produced in Fayetteville, Arkansas and is nationally acclaimed, with their productions reaching 22,000 patrons each year. TheatreSquared is Northwest Arkansas's only year-round professional theatre and performs in the 175-seat theater at Walton Arts Center's Nadine Baum Studios. In 2011, TheatreSquared was recognized by the American Theatre Wing  founder of the Tony Awards. As part of a $34 million capital campaign, the company recently broke ground on a 50,000 square-foot facility to be completed in mid-2019 that will include two venues, offices, artists' apartments, production workspaces, and a public cafe.

SoNA the Symphony of Northwest Arkansas was founded in 2011, previously named North Arkansas Symphony in 1954. The not-for-profit organization has provided 60 years of musical performances and educational opportunities, under the musical direction of Paul Haas.

Community Creative Center formally known as Northwest Arkansas Community Creative Center, is a visual arts organization located in Walton Arts Center's Nadine Baum Studios. Community Creative Center offers visual arts classes to children and adults along with specialized workshops.

Trike Theatre is Northwest Arkansas professional theatre for youth, formed in September 2008. It was founded by artistic director Kassie Misiewicz and provides classes at the Bentonville, AR studio, with additional workshops at Walton Arts Center.

Art Facilities

Baum Walker Hall is the main facility of Walton Arts Center. It is a proscenium stage seating 1155-1201. This venue is used for recitals, lectures, musical performances, ceremonies, and concerts.

Starr Theater is a black box theater that seats up to 250 people. Its space is 2,750 square feet and used for small shows and events.

Studio Theater is located at the Nadine Baum Studios on West Street across from Walton Arts Center. The capacity is 300 people and the space is 3,996 square feet.

McBride Studio has a capacity of 100 people and the venue is used for business meetings, pre and post-performance receptions, and classes.

Cynthia H. Coughlin Gallery/Main Lobby is used for receptions and dinners when there is not a performance and it serves as the gathering space before a performance. The area can hold up to 400 people at a time.

Bradberry Amphitheater/Rosen Memorial Rose Garden is located on Dickson Street, outside of Walton Arts Center. It is used for weddings, receptions and dinners and has a capacity of 200 people.

Joy Pratt Markham Gallery is a visual arts space located inside of Walton Arts Center, it has housed exhibitions such as Translating Earth, Transforming Sea by Shawn Bitters, Joan Hall and Laura Moriarty.

References

External links
Walton Arts Center Homepage

Arkansas culture
Performing arts centers in Arkansas
Buildings and structures in Fayetteville, Arkansas
Tourist attractions in Fayetteville, Arkansas
Event venues established in 1992